Miss Mato Grosso is a Brazilian Beauty pageant which selects the representative for the State of Mato Grosso at the Miss Brazil contest. The pageant was created in 1955 and has been held every year since with the exception of 1990-1991, and 1993. The pageant is held annually with representation of several municipalities. Since 2021, the State director of Miss Mato Grosso is, Cristina Ranzani. 

The following women from who competed as Miss Mato Grosso have won Miss Brazil:

, from Barão de Melgaço, in 1985
, from Sinop, in 2000
Jakelyne de Oliveira Silva, from Rondonópolis, in 2013

Gallery of Titleholders

Results Summary

Placements
Miss Brazil:  (1985);  (2000); Jakelyne de Oliveira Silva (2013)
1st Runner-Up:  (1966); Débora Moretto (1995); Camilla Della Valle (2020)
2nd Runner-Up: Alessandra Nardez (1992)
3rd Runner-Up: Marilena Lima (1965); Rosa Aparecida Azevêdo (1974); Sueli Capriata Vaccaro (1976); Karine Bonatto (1999)
4th Runner-Up: Shirley Damian (1980)
Top 5/Top 7/Top 8: Vilma Borges (1970); Camilla Della Valle (2015)
Top 10/Top 11/Top 12: Fernanda Frandsen (1981); Clarice Favretto (1984); Juliana Gross (1987); Miriam Gouvea (1988); Viviane Carrelo (1989); Raquel Ferreira (1996); Daiana Lenz (1998); Luciane Patrícia Locatelli (2001); Vanessa Regina de Jesus (2006); Juliana Florêncio Simon (2007); Juliete de Pieri (2010); Jéssica Duarte (2011); Eduarda da Rosa Zanella (2022)
Top 15/Top 16: Taiany Zimpel (2016); Aline Fontes (2017)

Special Awards
Miss Photogenic: 
Miss Congeniality: 
Miss Be Emotion: 
Miss Ellus Challenge:

Titleholders

Miss Mato Grosso: 1979–present
The titleholders for Miss Mato Grosso since 1979.

Miss Mato Grosso: 1954-1978
Before 1979, Mato Grosso and the now State of Mato Grosso do Sul were one state, because of this women from the now State of Mato Grosso do Sul were able to compete in Miss Mato Grosso due to the two being in one.

Table Notes

References

External links
Official Miss Brasil Website

Women in Brazil
Mato Grosso
Miss Brazil state pageants